Kozhino is a rural locality (a village) in Florishchinskoye Rural Settlement, Kolchuginsky District, Vladimir Oblast, Russia. The population was 5 as of 2010.

Geography 
Kozhino is located 13 km northwest of Kolchugino (the district's administrative centre) by road. Metallist is the nearest rural locality.

References 

Rural localities in Kolchuginsky District